Christ ist erstanden (Christ is risen),  SWV 470, is a sacred choral work by Heinrich Schütz, a setting of the German Easter hymn "Christ ist erstanden". It is scored for a three-part Favoritchor SAT, two Capellchor SATB, a choir of four trombones (Coro di tromboni), a choir of four viols (Coro di viole) and basso continuo.

Christ ist erstanden is part of the complete edition of the composer's works by Carus-Verlag, begun in 1992 as the Stuttgart Schütz Edition and planned to be completed by 2017.

References

External links 

 

Compositions by Heinrich Schütz
Choral compositions